Han Ji-eun (born 3 June 1987) is a South Korean actress. She made her acting debut in 2010 in the film Ghost. She is known for her work in both film and television including Real (2017), Rampant (2018), 100 Days My Prince (2018), Be Melodramatic (2019), and Lovestruck in the City (2020).

Early life
Han Ji-eun was born on 3 June 1987, she graduated from Dongduk Women's University, Department of Broadcasting and Entertainment.

Career
Han made her acting debut with the film Ghost (ko) in 2010, starring opposite Han Ye-ri.

In 2016, she led the cast of beauty drama Introduction to Beauty, a web series streamed on Naver TV.

In 2018, Han appeared in supporting roles in the films Rampant and Door Lock, and the dramas Twelve Nights and 100 Days My Prince.

In 2019, she landed her first lead role in the JTBC drama Be Melodramatic, in which she portrayed a single mother in her early thirties. In the same year she collaborated with radio DJ Jung Sung-gyu for the Sunday Music Drama aired on "Good Morning FM".

Han portrayed Lee Tae-ri in Kkondae Intern, a MBC drama broadcast from May to June 2020. In November, she made her first appearance on the variety show Running Man. She also appeared in KakaoTV's romantic comedy Lovestruck in the City as Oh Sun-young opposite Ryu Kyung-soo.

On 14 June 2021, it was announced that Han has signed with Secret ENT.

In 2021, she did a cameo in web series The Witch's Diner  and starred in the mystery drama Bad and Crazy as Hee-gyeom, a detective of the drug crime investigation team alongside Lee Dong-wook.

Filmography

Films

Television series

Web series

Music video appearances

Awards and nominations

References

External links

 
 
 Han Ji-eun on Daum 
 

21st-century South Korean actresses
South Korean film actresses
South Korean television actresses
South Korean web series actresses
Living people
1987 births
Dongduk Women's University alumni